Willie Cobb was an American Negro league outfielder in the 1900s.

Cobb played for the Cuban Giants in 1908, and for the Birmingham Giants the following season. In six recorded games, he posted nine hits in 25 plate appearances.

References

External links
Baseball statistics and player information from Baseball-Reference Black Baseball Stats and Seamheads

Year of birth missing
Year of death missing
Place of birth missing
Place of death missing
Birmingham Giants players
Cuban Giants players